Tomi Jason Tuuha (born 28 November 1989) is a Finnish  artistic gymnast.  He was a European gold medalist on vault in 2010 in Birmingham.

References

Living people
1989 births
Finnish male artistic gymnasts
European champions in gymnastics
European Games competitors for Finland
Gymnasts at the 2015 European Games
Sportspeople from Helsinki
21st-century Finnish people